Joseph Shabalala (28 August 1940 – 11 February 2020), was a South African singer and musician who was the founder and musical director of the choral group Ladysmith Black Mambazo.

Early life and career 
Shabalala was born in the town of Ladysmith (eMnambithi district) in the KwaZulu-Natal region of South Africa. His parents, Jonathan Mluwane Shabalala and Nomandla Elina Shabalala, raised Joseph and his six siblings on a white-owned farm called Tugela. His father died in the late 1940s; Joseph, being the eldest, had to take care of the family. He left the farm, however, in 1958 to search for work in the nearby city of Durban.

During this time, he was spotted by a well-known group, the Durban Choir, after he delighted audiences with his smooth guitar playing and soprano voice. When he joined the choir, he attempted to teach them some of his new compositions, namely his first song "Nomathemba" (which was made into a play in 1995). They refused, and so he left them after only two years.

In 1958, Shabalala discovered an isicathamiya group, The Highlanders, led by his hero Galiyane Hlatshwayo. Hlatshwayo was the man who encouraged Shabalala to use his voice powerfully. Shabalala formed his own group the following year 1959, Ezimnyama ("The Black Ones"). A series of dreams he had in his sleep in December 1960 was a major turning point in the formation of the group; when he saw how well his group did in the once-weekly isicathamiya competitions, he renamed them Ladysmith Black Mambazo, "Mambazo" meaning axe, referring to how the group chopped down the other choirs by winning almost every time.

After local radio airplay (on the S.A.B.C. station Radio Zulu), Shabalala accepted a recording contract that was offered in 1972 by Gallo Music producer West Nkosi. The group sold over 40,000 copies of their first album Imbongi. and continued to do so through other recordings. In 1976, he became a Christian, and the songs in the Mambazo repertoire were shuffled to one side to include generalized Christian, Methodist, and Zionist hymns sung in the Zulu language.

Rising to stardom

In 1986, Paul Simon travelled to South Africa to collaborate with South African artists for his upcoming Graceland album. Simon collaborated with Shabalala and the group, and co-composed the now-famous song, "Homeless". The group's popularity spread all over the world, and since then they have sold records popular enough to earn platinum disc certification. In 1987, the group won their first solo Grammy Award for Shaka Zulu. Since then, they have won a second Grammy, and have been nominated more than ten times for the award. Following the worldwide success of Graceland, Shabalala began composing more songs in English (prior to this they had only recorded two in English and one in German).

On the night of 10 December 1991, his brother and fellow member Headman Shabalala was killed by an off-duty white security guard near the town of Ladysmith. The death was thought to be a racial murder. Joseph, helped by his beliefs, persevered, and the group continued; the members now included his brother Jockey, close relatives Albert and Abednego Mazibuko, Russel Mthembu and Jabulani Dubazana and his sons Sibongiseni, Thamsanqa, Thulani and Msizi. Nevertheless, tragedy returned. In May 2002, Shabalala's wife of 30 years, Nellie, was shot and killed by an assailant outside the couple's home in Clermont, KwaZulu-Natal. Shabalala's hand was wounded in his attempt to protect his wife. Mboneni Mdunge was convicted of the murder and sentenced to life in prison. At the same trial, Shabalala's son Nkosinathi Vivian Shabalala (Nellie's stepson) was charged, tried, and acquitted on charges of having paid Mdunge for Nellie's murder.

Later life and death 
The next album from the group, Wenyukela, was expected to have a solemn tone in the wake of Nellie’s murder. Indeed, it did, including a tribute to Nellie by her grandsons Gagamela and Babuyile Shabalala. The track encouraged their grandfather to carry on, while assuring him that "S-H-A-B-A-L-A-L-A will live on." 

Six months after Nellie's death, Joseph Shabalala married Thoko Maduna, which was characterized as a "controversial stunt” by the South African press. Shabalala continued to carry on singing, and established the Ladysmith Black Mambazo Foundation, a music academy to promote and teach isicathamiya music to young South African children.

Tragedy struck again in June 2004 when his brother (and former Mambazo member) Ben Shabalala was shot and killed by an unknown individual whilst driving his two children to school. In February 2006, his brother Jockey (Joseph’s only remaining brother in the group by this time), died of natural causes at his home in Ladysmith, South Africa.

In January 2008, Shabalala announced that his youngest son, Thamsanqa, would take over as leader of Ladysmith Black Mambazo when the time came for Joseph to retire from international touring. That time came in early 2014, when Shabalala sat out a three-month tour, although he continued to sing on special occasions.

On 11 February 2020, Shabalala died in Pretoria, South Africa.
At his death, many media outlets reported that he was 78 years old, which would suggest that Joseph Shabalala was born in August of 1941. However, the government of South Africa has officially declared that he was born in 1940, making Shabalala 79 years old at the time of his death.

See also
 Ladysmith Black Mambazo Foundation
 Mahlathini and the Mahotella Queens

References

External links
 Ladysmith Black Mambazo's official site

Ladysmith Black Mambazo members
1940 births
2020 deaths
South African record producers
20th-century South African male singers
South African male composers
South African Christians
21st-century South African male singers
People from Ladysmith, KwaZulu-Natal
Zulu people
Zulu-language singers